Hari Singh Zira  was an Indian politician and belongs to the Shiromani Akali Dal. He was a member of Punjab Legislative Assembly and represented Zira.

Family
His father's name is Jaswant Singh. He has a son (Avatar Singh).

Political career
Zira was elected to Punjab Legislative Assembly from Zira constituency in 2002. In 2007, he lost to Congress candidate Naresh Kumar.

References

Living people
Indian Sikhs
Punjab, India MLAs 2012–2017
Year of birth missing (living people)
Place of birth missing (living people)
Shiromani Akali Dal politicians
People from Firozpur district
Punjab, India MLAs 2002–2007